The 1980 Detroit Tigers finished in fifth place in the American League East with a record of 84–78, 19 games behind the Yankees. They outscored their opponents 830 to 757. The Tigers drew 1,785,293 fans to Tiger Stadium in 1980, ranking 7th of the 14 teams in the American League.

Offseason 
 December 7, 1979: Ron LeFlore was traded by the Tigers to the Montreal Expos for Dan Schatzeder.

Regular season

Season standings 

Boston's record of 83–77 has a fractionally better winning percentage that Detroit's record of 84–78; .51875 and .51851, respectively.

Record vs. opponents

Notable transactions 
 June 2, 1980: Al Greene and John Martin were traded by the Tigers to the St. Louis Cardinals for Jim Lentine.
 June 3, 1980: Chuck Hensley was drafted by the Tigers in the 10th round of the 1980 Major League Baseball draft.
 June 6, 1980: Bárbaro Garbey was signed as an amateur free agent by the Tigers.
 September 21, 1980: Roger Mason was signed as an amateur free agent by the Tigers.

Roster

Player stats

Batting

Starters by position 
Note: Pos = Position; G = Games played; AB = At bats; H = Hits; Avg. = Batting average; HR = Home runs; RBI = Runs batted in

Other batters 
Note: G = Games played; AB = At bats; H = Hits; Avg. = Batting average; HR = Home runs; RBI = Runs batted in

Note: pitchers' batting statistics not included

Pitching

Starting pitchers 
Note: G = Games pitched; IP = Innings pitched; W = Wins; L = Losses; ERA = Earned run average; SO = Strikeouts

Other pitchers 
Note: G = Games pitched; IP = Innings pitched; W = Wins; L = Losses; ERA = Earned run average; SO = Strikeouts

Relief pitchers 
Note: G = Games pitched; W = Wins; L = Losses; SV = Saves; GF = Games finished; ERA = Earned run average; SO = Strikeouts

Awards and honors 
 Lance Parrish, AL Silver Slugger Award, catcher
 Alan Trammell, AL Gold Glove Award, shortstop
 Alan Trammell, Tiger of the Year Award, from Detroit sportswriters

All Star selections 
 Lance Parrish, AL All Star Team, catcher
 Alan Trammell, AL All Star Team, shortstop

League top ten finishers 
Steve Kemp
 #2 in MLB in time grounded into double plays (24)
 #5 in AL in sacrifice flies

Aurelio López
 #3 in AL in games (67)
 #3 in AL in games finished (59)

Jack Morris
 #3 in AL in earned runs allowed (116)
 #4 in AL in games started (36)
 #10 in MLB in bases on balls allowed (87)
 #10 in MLB in losses (15)

Lance Parrish
 #2 in MLB in time grounded into double plays (24)
 #4 in AL in strikeouts (109)
 #10 in MLB in extra base hits (64)

Alan Trammell
 #5 in AL in runs scored (107)
 #6 in AL in sacrifice hits (13)

Milt Wilcox
 #10 in MLB in complete games (13)

Players ranking among top 100 all time at position 
The following members of the 1979 Detroit Tigers are among the Top 100 of all time at their position, as ranked by The Bill James Historical Baseball Abstract in 2001:
 Lance Parrish: 19th best catcher of all time 
 Lou Whitaker: 13th best second baseman of all time 
 Alan Trammell: 9th best shortstop of all time

Farm system

See also

 1980 in Michigan

Notes

References 

 1980 Detroit Tigers Regular Season Statistics at Baseball Reference

Detroit Tigers seasons
Detroit Tigers season
Detroit Tiger
1980 in Detroit